Ronan O'Toole is a Gaelic footballer for St Loman's and Westmeath.

He was a member of the team that defeated Dublin at Parnell Park in the 2019 O'Byrne Cup final, his county's first time to win that trophy since 1988. He won his second piece of silverware of 2019 when Westmeath won the 2019 National Football League Division 3 league title by a goal against Laois at Croke Park, O'Toole scored 0–2.

He was man of the match in the 2022 Tailteann Cup Final. He scored five points from play and was nominated for Footballer of the Week on GAA.ie.

O'Toole was also involved in the game's turning point when Cavan's Tomás Galligan charged at him with his shoulder and hit him straight into the face. The referee had no option but to wipe out his cards and show Galligan the red one for this offence.

As of 2022, O'Toole was an analyst with JP Morgan.

Honours
Westmeath
 Tailteann Cup (1): 2022
 National Football League Division 3 (1): 2019
 O'Byrne Cup (1): 2019

Individual
 Tailteann Cup Player of the Year (1): 2022
 Tailteann Cup Team of the Year (1): 2022

References

External links
 Westmeath's Ronan O'Toole relishing the Tailteann Cup Final buzz

Year of birth missing (living people)
Living people
JPMorgan Chase people
St Loman's Gaelic footballers
Westmeath inter-county Gaelic footballers